Elias Nicolas Bou Saab (born 8 September 1967) is a Lebanese politician. He was a Minister of National Defense, Advisor to the President of Lebanon Michel Aoun on International Cooperation. He was elected Deputy speaker of the Lebanese parliament on May 31, 2022. He was also a member of the founding board of directors of television station OTV.

Early life 
Elias Bou Saab was born in Dhour El Choueir in Mount Lebanon on September 8, 1967. He is the son of Nicolas Bou Saab and Janette Owayjan.

He attended St. Joseph School in Cornet Chahwan from 1971 till 1987. After graduating from high school, Elias traveled to the United Kingdom to attend The American College in London to receive his Bachelor of Business Administration in Marketing, where he was elected twice President of the Student Government Association. He later received his Masters of Arts in International Relations from Boston University in the Spring of 1994.

In 1992, he founded The Lebanese Graduates of Britain (LGB) and served as its first President.

Career 
Elias Bou Saab founded the American University in Dubai in 1995. He is the Executive Vice President and has overseen the University's development into one of the premier institutions of higher education in the region. Bou Saab has developed several scholarship programs at AUD.

He has been an active member of the Clinton Global Initiative since its inception in 2005. He created a scholarship program in President Clinton’s name to provide U.S. students the opportunity to study in the Middle East. These programs have received great support from Sheikh Mohammed Bin Rashid Al Maktoum, Vice President and Prime Minister of the UAE, Ruler of Dubai. He was a member of the founding board of directors of television station OTV, Al Mada.org news site, Fame Fm and Sawt El Mada radio station, which are the broadcasting channels of the Free Patriotic Movement. He is also the co-founder of the Emirati Lebanese Friendship Association and a former member of the Board of Directors of the Young Arab Leaders.

Political career 
In 2010, Bou Saab was elected President of the municipality to his native village of Dhour El Choueir located in Maten region of Mount Lebanon. He was able to raise the quality of living for the people of his village through achievements such as providing running electricity, water, and reviving the Famous Immigrant Festival of Dhour El Choueir.

In February 2014, Bou Saab was named Minister of Education and Higher Education in Lebanon, one of the two representatives of Michel Aoun's Free Patriotic Movement in the Tammam Salam's government. . As Minister of Education, Bou Saab was in charge of overseeing the Lebanese education system and addressing the pressing challenges created by the influx of Syrian refugees that has nearly doubled the student population in Lebanon. Bou Saab called on the international community to help resolve the humanitarian crisis in Lebanon.  He proposed five action plans: creating an emergency support office in the Ministry of Education, rehabilitating existing schools and establishing new schools, incorporating all education activities under the formal education system, improving the quality of public schools, and strengthening the national education system. The plan will be implemented with international support from Global institutions such as the United Nations Special Envoy for Global Education, UNICEF, UNCHR, the World Bank, DFID, and USAID. In March 2017, the President of Lebanon Michel Aoun appointed Bou Saab as his advisor on International Cooperation. he was elected in May 2018 as member of Lebanese Parliament representing Metn District on "Strong Metn" List. Since then, he is a member of the Free Patriotic Movement.

He was then elected Deputy Speaker of the Lebanese Parliament succeeding Elie Ferzli following the 2022 elections amid the ongoing economic crisis. Bou Saab was able to win by a slim margin of 50.78% of the vote after a 2 round vote took place.

Personal life 
He is Married to the renowned singer Julia Boutros and has two sons, Samer and Tarek.

References 

1967 births
Living people
Free Patriotic Movement politicians
Defense ministers of Lebanon
Education ministers of Lebanon
Mayors of places in Lebanon
People named in the Panama Papers
Lebanese people of Armenian descent
Greek Orthodox Christians from Lebanon
People from Dhour El Choueir